was a stable of sumo wrestlers, part of the Tatsunami ichimon or group of stables. It was set up in 1980 by former ōzeki Asahikuni, who branched off from Tatsunami stable. The head of Tatsunami stable opposed the setting up of the new stable, and did not speak to Ōshima until Asahifuji was promoted to ōzeki in 1987. Ōshima produced ten sekitori, all of whom went on to reach the top makuuchi division. Ōshima's senior wrestler in later years was the Mongolian born veteran Kyokutenhō, who has Japanese citizenship and was seen as the successor to Ōshima.  However, after Kyokutenhō indicated a desire to continue wrestling, the stable instead closed on 25 April 2012 when Ōshima reached the mandatory retirement age of 65, with its wrestlers transferring to Tomozuna stable.

Ring name conventions
Most wrestlers' fighting names included the Chinese character "旭" meaning "sunrise", that can be read as either Asahi or Kyoku, taken from the founding stablemaster's shikona.

Owner
1980-2012: 2nd Ōshima (former ōzeki Asahikuni)

Notable wrestlers
Asahifuji (the 63rd Yokozuna)
Kyokutenhō (sekiwake)
Kyokudōzan (komusubi)
Asahiyutaka (komusubi)
Kyokushūzan (komusubi)
Kyokunankai (maegashira)
Kyokugōzan (maegashira)
Kyokushūhō (maegashira)
Kyokutaisei (maegashira)
Asahisato (maegashira)
Asahishō  (maegashira)

Referees
Shozaburo Kimura (real name Saburo Hatakeyama) - san'yaku referee
Hisayuki Kimura (Toshikazu Hata) - makuuchi referee

Usher
Akira 	(Toshiyuki Ichikawa) - makuuchi usher

Location
3-5-3 Ryōgoku, Sumida, Tokyo, 10 minute walk from Ryōgoku Station

See also
List of sumo stables
Glossary of sumo terms

References

External links
 Japan Sumo Association profile of Ōshima beya

Defunct sumo stables